Video Pub is a gay bar in Jerusalem. It is the only dedicated gay bar in the city, which is generally known for its religious conservatism.

Description
Video Pub was established in January, 2012. While it is the only gay bar in Jerusalem, it was not the first. A now-defunct gay bar called "The Mikveh" had previously opened in 2011. The building that Video Bar is located in was previously a farmhouse outside of Jerusalem's Old City district, before the area was urbanized.

References

External links

Video Pub Jerusalem on Instagram

2012 establishments in Israel
LGBT culture in Jerusalem
LGBT nightclubs
Russian Compound